Charlestown (ER) railway station served the town of Charlestown, Fife, Scotland from 1833 to 1863 on the Elgin Railway.

History 
The station opened on 31 October 1833 by the Elgin Railway. It closed on 30 September 1863, although a newer station opened on the Kincardine Line in 1894.

References 

Disused railway stations in Fife
Railway stations in Great Britain opened in 1833
Railway stations in Great Britain closed in 1863
1833 establishments in Scotland
1863 disestablishments in Scotland